Cropwell, also known as Coosa or Coosa Valley, is a neighborhood of Pell City, Alabama, United States. Cropwell is a small town and an unincorporated community. Cropwell has its own post office with ZIP code 35054. Cropwell was originally called Coosa or Coosa Valley until 1837, when it began to be called Cropwell. A post office operated under the name Coosa during 1833 and 1834. A post office was then established under the name Cropwell in 1837.

Demographics

Cropwell appeared on the 1880 U.S. Census with 105 residents. 
The population in Cropwell is 3,936. There are 151 people per square mile. The median age in Cropwell is 52.5. The U.S. median age is 37.4. The number of people per household in Cropwell is 2.2. The U.S. average of people per household is 2.6.

References

Populated places in St. Clair County, Alabama
Neighborhoods in Alabama